Mikaela Engell (born 4 October 1956) is a Danish civil servant who served as High Commissioner of Greenland, a post she has held from 2011 to 2022. She had previously worked in the Danish Ministry of Foreign Affairs, first as a Permanent Secretary and later as a counselor. 

As High Commissioner, Engell had a seat in the Inatsisartut (parliament of Greenland), representing the Danish monarch and government, and can speak there, but not vote. She is also an ex officio member of the Danish-Greenland Cultural Foundation.

References
The High Commissioner of Greenland at The Prime Minister's Office website

1956 births
Living people
High Commissioners of Greenland